Julian TAN Kok Ping is a Malaysian politician. He was the Member of the Parliament of Malaysia for the  constituency in Sarawak, representing the Democratic Action Party (DAP) after winning the seat for the opposition party for the first time after the 2013 Malaysian general election, wresting the seat from long time MP Datuk Yong Khoon Seng. He has not contested in 2018 Malaysian general election, and the seat candidate was changed to the former Bandar Kuching MP Chong Chieng Jen.

Before entering politics, he was an aerospace engineer and researcher, graduating with a Masters of Engineering Science (Scholarship) from the Universiti Tunku Abdul Rahman.  Julian decided not to defend his parliamentary seat in the 14th Malaysian general election and instead retire from politics to focus on his research, science and technology career. He did his doctorate from Monash University under the Merit Scholarship and was conferred the award Doctor Of Philosophy (PhD) in Engineering on 30th March 2022.

Election results

References

Living people
Members of the Dewan Rakyat
Democratic Action Party (Malaysia) politicians
People from Kuching
Malaysian politicians of Chinese descent
1978 births
Universiti Tunku Abdul Rahman